High Tension Wires is the third studio album by the guitarist Steve Morse, released on May 1, 1989, by MCA Records. The album reached No. 182 on the U.S. Billboard 200.

Track listing

Personnel
Steve Morse – guitar, synthesizer, engineering, mixing, production
T Lavitz – keyboard, synthesizer, piano
Rod Morgenstein – drums
Jerry Peek – bass
Andy West – bass
Allen Sloan – violin
Rick Sandidge – engineering, mixing
Tom Wright – engineering
Glenn Meadows – mastering
Ricky Schultz – executive production

Chart performance

References

External links
In Review: Steve Morse Band "High Tension Wires" at Guitar Nine Records

Steve Morse albums
1989 albums
MCA Records albums